In anatomy, a hiatus is a natural fissure in a structure. Examples include:
 Adductor hiatus
 Aortic hiatus
 Esophageal hiatus, the opening in the diaphragm through   which the oesophagus passes from the thorax into the abdomen
 Greater petrosal nerve hiatus
 Maxillary hiatus
 Sacral hiatus
 Semilunar hiatus

Anatomy